Live and Let Live is a 2013 documentary film by German filmmaker and director Marc Pierschel. The film follows several vegan activists and interviews vegan proponents. The documentary explores the reasons for adopting veganism and how people live according to this lifestyle.

Synopsis 
The documentary film examines the relationship that humans have with animal by following six different individuals who moved to veganism for different reasons. With, for example, a butcher who became a vegan chef, a factory farmer who started a farm sanctuary, a professional athlete who changed his complete diet, and activists for the animal rights movement Animal Equality. Besides the film explores the history of veganism and the ethical, environmental and health reasons why people become vegan by interviewing proponents of the vegan movement.

Accolades 
In 2014 the movie was screened, among other places, at the 19th Milano Film Festival, Tage des unabhängigen Films in Augsburg and the Utopianale Filmfestival in Hannover. It became an official selection of Crossroads Film Festival, and was nominated for a 'Cosmic Angel' at the Cosmic Cine Film Festival.

Appearances 
The documentary stars the notable appearance of Jonathan Balcombe (ethologist and biologist); T. Colin Campbell (professor of nutritional biochemistry and writer of The China Study); Melanie Joy (sociologist and psychologist, on the ideology of carnism); Will Potter (journalist and author of Green Is The New Red); Peter Singer (professor of bioethics); Tom Regan (distinguished professor of philosophy on animal rights); Gary Francione (distinguished professor of law on 'abolitionism'); George Rodger (chair of The Vegan Society); and Jack Lindquist (professional track cyclist and vegan).

See also
 List of vegan media

References

External links 
 
 

2013 films
2013 documentary films
German independent films
German documentary films
English-language German films
Films about activists
Vegetarianism in Germany
2010s English-language films
2010s German films
Documentary films about veganism